Telephlebia tillyardi is a species of dragonfly in the family Telephlebiidae,
known as the tropical evening darner. 
It is a medium to large, dark chestnut brown dragonfly with dark markings on the leading edge of its wings.
It is endemic to north-eastern Australia, where it inhabits stream margins,
and flies at dusk.

Telephlebia tillyardi appears similar to Telephlebia tryoni.

Gallery

See also
 List of Odonata species of Australia

References

Telephlebiidae
Odonata of Australia
Endemic fauna of Australia
Taxa named by Herbert Campion
Insects described in 1916